American football, known locally as "gridiron", is a participation and spectator sport in Australia. The sport is represented by Gridiron Australia, a member of the International Federation of American Football (IFAF), and also Gridiron Victoria, which operates independent of Gridiron Australia 

The sport has been played in six Australian states and territories across the country since World War II, but has only had regular league play since 1983.  There is no uniform gridiron season in Australia. The various state and territory bodies play at different times of the year. There are currently 73 junior and senior teams playing gridiron in Australia. The national team has competed in the IFAF World Cup and other international competitions.

American football has an increasing media profile in Australia.  The National Football League is broadcast on both free-to-air television through 7mate and subscription television through the Fox Sports and ESPN channels available on Foxtel and Austar, including the Super Bowl live on the Seven Network.  Due to interest in converts from Australian rules football and Rugby League, particularly Ben Graham, Saverio Rocca and Jarryd Hayne, the game is also regularly covered by the Herald Sun and other newspapers.

History

Some of the earliest matches in Australia involved visiting American servicemen. A match in Sydney between crews of the USS Baltimore in May 1906 attracted 14,000 people who watched the Stripes defeat Brown 10 to 1.

In 1925 a match was held between crews of the USS Trenton and USS Pennsylvania at the Punt Road Oval in Melbourne. A similar match was played at the Sydney Showground. Both attracted interest and crowds.

In 1932 rugby league administrator Harry Sunderland proposed assembling an Australian gridiron team to send to America however cyinics in the Australian media saw it as an attempt to promote rugby league in America rather than to promote gridiron in Australia.

Post-war

A high-profile match in Adelaide played on American Independence Day (4 July) 1942 by American servicemen attracted a crowd of 25,000.

Several matches were played in Sydney in 1943 and another high-profile match was played in Brisbane in 1944, all featuring American servicemen.  Another match was held in Melbourne at an unknown date during the war.

Matches of Austus were also played against Australian rules footballers featuring a set of compromise rules.

However, the game did not take hold in Australia after the war.

First local leagues

In 1983 the first fully organised gridiron teams in Australia were formed in Melbourne, Victoria and further north, an ad was placed over a Sydney radio station advertising for American football enthusiasts to assemble in early 1984. The response was remarkable and several teams comprising enthusiastic amateurs who had been throwing the ball around on Sunday afternoons
were formed. The first season saw all games being played at a disused rubbish tip. There were no goal posts, no medical supervision and no insurance. The early pioneers did not wear helmets but found kick boxing protective headgear useful.

1984 saw the first interstate clash when a team from Melbourne travelled to Sydney to play. NSW won the match 30–7. American Football had arrived in Australia.

Soon football equipment began to be imported into Australia. Coaches came from the University of Hawaii for clinics and to help train players. These efforts helped lay the foundation for the sport to develop in Australia so that other leagues could start up around the country.

Also in 1984 the Australian American Football Conference was founded (later renamed the Australian American Football League). It was a high-profile team, which the media and sponsors would see as a positive entity to promote the sport, created by Randall Trudgen. The first Kookaburras embarked on an extensive tour to the US, training at US Colleges. The LA Rams assisted in hosting the Kookaburras. The Kookaburras would tour the US and Europe annually until 1992.

In 1985 the first organised competition was played in Queensland. The 1st year of competition of the Queensland Gridiron Football League was contested by four clubs, the Brisbane Bulldogs, the Mitchelton Warriors, the Pine Grove Steelers, and the Kenmore Centurions. Unable to gain access to the usual equipment of the game, the teams took the field in the 1st year in makeshift padding and uniforms (without helmets) while still utilising all the normal rules of the games.  In the Championship game, SUNBOWL I, the Brisbane Bulldogs defeated the Mitchelton Warriors 5–2.

In January 1986 the inaugural South Australian Gridiron Association season commenced with 4 teams: Eastside Razorbacks, Brighton Breakers, Port Adelaide Spartans and Southern Longhorns playing Saturday double-header games at Norwood Oval which had high standard lighting to play under.

In November 1989 the Grand Prix Challenge was held in Adelaide, a four-way competition involving Victoria, South Australia, Western Australia and New South Wales. New South Wales went on to win the Challenge.

In 1990 the Down Under Bowl tournament commenced in Australia and is still going strong. Each year individual American States are invited to field High School all-star teams, travel to Australia and
spread the growth of the game down under. Games are played against local Australian teams and between US teams. 1998 saw the most successful year yet with 36 teams travelling to the Gold Coast in Queensland to compete in the Down Under Bowl.

Trans Tasman competition came to Melbourne in January 1991 when Victoria played the visiting South Auckland Raiders from New Zealand, finishing in a 19–19 draw.

A series of interstate Bowl games were to be played between all major States in October/November 1991. The Victorians were rewarded with a good win. The following week saw the NSW state team go down to the Victorian Eagles at Olympic Park. This left Victoria as the National State Champions for 1991.

The National Gridiron League of Australia (NGLA) was formed in January 1991 "to govern and promote American football on the national level and to represent Australian gridiron on the international scene."

Gridiron Australia (GA) was formed in 1994, with the aim of replacing the old National Gridiron League of Australia. By 1995 American football was being played in every State and Territory in Australia, a total of approximately 100 teams.

In 1995 Darren Bennett became the third Australian to play in the NFL when he was selected as the punter for the San Diego Chargers. The first Australian to play in the NFL was Colin Ridgeway, who played Aussie Rules for Carlton Football Club in the 1960s before being picked up by the Dallas Cowboys as a punter. After him came Colin Scotts, who went to college in Hawaii before being drafted to play with the Phoenix Cardinals and then the Houston Oilers in the middle to late 1980s.

Gridiron Australia's First National Championships were held in the nation's capital, Canberra, in January 1996. Both senior and junior teams from New South Wales, the ACT, Victoria and South Australia attended. South Australia won the Senior Championship 34-0 and New South Wales won the Junior Championship 12–8.

In 1996, 24 US teams toured Australia and New Zealand as part of Down Under Bowl VIII. Both Victoria and South Australia recorded wins over US teams.

In 1997 the Australia Day Championships were held in Sydney, with Queensland taking the Championship.

In 1997 Australia resumed its international campaign, against New Zealand. On 1 August 1997 the Australian Bushrangers played the New Zealand Haka in Auckland, New Zealand. The game, the inaugural Anzac Bowl, was a great success.

On 7 January the Australian American Football League (AAFL) was formed.

On 31 January 1998 the Bushrangers played Team Hawaii in Honolulu during the National Football League's Pro Bowl week. Trips to Europe and Japan are also planned. Australia has participated in the Gridiron World Cup since 1999.

In May 1998 the AAFL was dissolved, with Gridiron Australia becoming the only National body involved in the management of Gridiron matters in Australia.

On August 7, 1999, the first American Bowl in Australia was played in Sydney between the Denver Broncos and San Diego Chargers at Stadium Australia, the first American pro football game to be held in the Southern Hemisphere.  The game attendance was announced at 73,811 spectators.

In 2001, the 2nd Gridiron Australia National Championships were played in Canberra again with 6 states competing. Western Australia defeated New South Wales in the final.

In 2003 & 2005 the week long Gridiron Australia National Championships were played at the Pines Hockey Stadium in Adelaide, both won by New South Wales.

In 2008, Ten HD announced it would televise the NFL season on free-to-air television, including the Super Bowl live.

In March 2012, the inaugural Australian Gridiron League series was launched, with state teams from New South Wales, Queensland, Victoria and Western Australia participating. Australia hosted two games of the 2012 LFL All-Fantasy Game Tour Two exhibition games between the Eastern and Western Conferences took place on Australia's east coast in Brisbane and Sydney. Queensland native and wide receiver for the Los Angeles Temptation Chloe Butler served as the ambassador of LFL Football coming to Australia and captained the Western Conference squad.

The first Women's Gridiron competition in Australia the Female Gridiron League of Queensland (FGLQ) was launched in 2012 with 3 teams: The Logan City Jets, The Kenmore Panthers and the Gold Coast Sea Wolves. An initiative of the Logan City Gridiron Football Club who developed the competition, the inaugural season was the very first Women's 'Full Kit' Gridiron Competition in Australia. The Logan City Jets were crowned Summerbowl I winners after defeating the Kenmore Panthers. Season 2013 saw the FGLQ expand to 4 teams: Logan City Jets, Kenmore Panthers, Gold Coast Stingrays (as the Gold Coast Stingrays organisation took over running the Gold Coast Sea Wolves) and the new Ipswich Jaguars (joining from the Ipswich Cougars club). Another successful season culminated in the Gold Coast Stingrays defeating the Logan City Jets in Summerbowl II. In season 2014 the competition looks set to expand again with new teams joining including: the Southern Steelers, Sunshine Coast Spartans and a Moreton Bay/Redcliffe side. Gridiron Queensland has taken over responsibility of the FGLQ after two highly successful years of development under the LCGFC banner.

The first interstate women's games were played in 2012 with the Western Foxes hosting the Tuggeranong Tornadoes from Canberra, with the Tornadoes winning. A Queensland 'All Stars', side selected from ladies who had played in the inaugural FGLQ season, soon traveled to Victoria to play the Western Foxes with the Queensland side winning.

In 2013, Gridiron Australia established the National Club Championship (NCC) Rankings and, on 11 August 2013, staged the first National Club Championship Game, with the #1 ranked Sydney Uni Lions defeating the #2 ranked Gold Coast Stingrays 45–13 at the Square, Sydney University.

LFL Australia premiered in December 2013. The New South Wales Surge, Queensland Brigade, Victoria Maidens, and Western Australia Angels played in the inaugural 2013–14 LFL Australia season, but it was later replaced by the Ladies Gridiron League.

In August 2014, a representative team from Western Australia played the Philippines Aguilas in Manila winning 56-7 and in 2015, Gridiron South Australia celebrated its 30th season.

Since 2014, Victoria has run its own league, Gridiron Victoria, independent and unaffiliated with Gridiron Australia. Gridiron Victoria is composed of 11 clubs, with thriving Senior Men's, Women, and Colts competitions.

In 2016 plans were announced for a National Gridiron League. However the inaugural season was postponed to October 2017.

See also

Gridiron Australia
Australians in American football

References

External links
Gridiron Australia official website